Steve Riggle is the founding pastor and current Senior Pastor of Grace Community Church,  a megachurch in Houston, Texas. He is the President of Grace International which was formerly known as Christian Evangelistic Assemblies. Riggle is also a member of the Board of Trustees of The King's University.

Space Shuttle Columbia disaster

In the aftermath of the Space Shuttle Columbia disaster, Riggle was interviewed numerous times by both secular and religiously oriented media. Commander Rick Husband and Payload Commander Mike Anderson were both members of Grace Community Church.

COVID-19 Controversy

In December 2020, Riggle led hundreds of people in maskless Christmas caroling to protest statewide restrictions during the second wave of the COVID-19 pandemic. Although Texas Republican governor Greg Abbott had issued an executive order establishing a statewide face covering requirement, the Montgomery County Sheriff's Office stated that they would not enforce this order.

Published works
 The Sharper Edge (Watercolor Books, 2002)

References

Articles, quotes & transcripts

External links
 Grace Community Church
 Grace International
 Christian Evangelistic Assemblies

Living people
American Christian clergy
Year of birth missing (living people)